Saint Maud is a 2019 British psychological horror film written and directed by Rose Glass in her feature directorial debut. The story follows hospice nurse Maud (portrayed by Morfydd Clark), a recent convert to Roman Catholicism, who becomes obsessed with a former dancer in her care (Jennifer Ehle), believing she must save her soul by any means necessary.

Saint Maud premiered at the Toronto International Film Festival on 8 September 2019, and was theatrically released in the United Kingdom on 9 October 2020 by StudioCanal UK. The film received acclaim from critics, who praised the direction, atmosphere, performances, and score.

Plot
A nurse named Katie fails to save the life of a patient in her care, despite attempting CPR.

Some time later, Katie, now referring to herself as Maud, has become a devout Roman Catholic and is working as a private palliative care nurse in an English seaside town. She is assigned to care for Amanda, a dancer and choreographer from the United States who is terminally ill with stage four lymphoma. Amanda is embittered by her fate and confesses to Maud that she fears the oblivion of death. Maud comes to believe that God has tasked her with saving the atheist Amanda's soul. Maud reveals to Amanda that she sometimes feels God's presence, and she and Amanda appear to be overcome with ecstasy as they pray together.

Maud becomes suspicious of Amanda's companion Carol, who visits regularly and whom Amanda pays for sex. She implores Carol to stop visiting because she believes Amanda's soul is in jeopardy due to distractions of the flesh. Carol is incensed by this, accusing Maud of homophobia, but Maud rebukes this stating that she would not care whether Carol were a man or a woman. Carol attends Amanda's birthday party anyway, and in front of Maud, Amanda informs the partygoers that Maud tried to drive Carol away. The party guests laugh at Maud and wrap a headcovering on Maud's hair. Amanda mocks the young nurse for trying to save her soul and suggests that she is a homophobic prude, jealous of Carol and Amanda's affair. Maud strikes Amanda and is dismissed from her job.

Believing that God has rejected her, Maud visits a pub to find companionship but is rejected by most of the people she meets. She goes home with a man and during sex, suffers flashbacks of the death of her patient and her attempts at CPR, which causes her to stop. The man finishes and, as she is leaving, taunts her by revealing he remembers her hooking up with a friend of his during her hedonistic past.

While out walking, she encounters Amanda's new nurse and storms off when she realizes that her replacement enjoys a good relationship with Amanda. In her decrepit apartment, Maud begs for a sign from God who appears to tell her to be ready for an act that will demonstrate her faith. Repentant of her actions, Maud assembles a spugna for her right foot to practice the mortification of the flesh.

That night, Maud, dressed in a makeshift robe and wearing rosary beads, enters Amanda's house after the care nurse leaves. She finds Amanda in bed, weakened. Amanda asks forgiveness for mocking her faith, and Maud joyously reminds her of the time they experienced God's presence. Amanda reveals that she feigned the experience and that she believes God is not real. Maud recoils in horror as a now-demonic Amanda hurls her across the room and mocks her for needing to prove her faith. In a delirious frenzy, Maud stabs Amanda to death.

In the morning, Maud wanders onto a beach and douses herself with acetone before horrified onlookers. She utters her last words in Welsh — "Glory to God" — as she self-immolates. In her last moments, angel wings appear upon her and the onlookers kneel in awe as Maud looks up to the sky glowing with grace. The scene then reverts to a burning Maud screaming in agony.

Cast

Production
The film was developed by Escape Plan Productions with funding from Film4. In November 2018, it was announced Clark and Ehle had joined the cast of the film, with Rose Glass directing from her own screenplay. The film was fully financed by Film4 Productions and the British Film Institute. The scenes with the beach and the seaside town was filmed in the town of Scarborough, North Yorkshire.

Release
The film had its world premiere at the Toronto International Film Festival on 8 September 2019. Shortly after, A24 and StudioCanal acquired U.S. and U.K. distribution rights to the film. It also screened at Fantastic Fest on 19 September 2019, and the BFI London Film Festival on 5 October 2019. The film went on to receive a Special Commendation in the Official Competition section of the London Film Festival, with the jury president, Wash Westmoreland, saying, "This dazzling directorial debut marks the emergence of a powerful new voice in British cinema."

It was scheduled to be released in the United States on 10 April 2020,  and the United Kingdom on 1 May 2020. However, due to the COVID-19 pandemic, the release was postponed in the United States until 17 July 2020, and was later pulled entirely from the schedule. It was released theatrically in the United Kingdom on 9 October 2020 to positive reviews, and was released on DVD and Blu-ray in the United Kingdom on 1 February 2021. It was released as a limited release in the United States on 29 January 2021, followed by video on demand and Epix on 12 February 2021.

Reception
The site's critics consensus reads, "A brilliantly unsettling blend of body horror and psychological thriller, Saint Maud marks an impressive debut for writer-director Rose Glass." On Metacritic, the film has a weighted average score of 83 out of 100 based on 35 critics, indicating "universal acclaim".

Director Danny Boyle described Saint Maud as "a genuinely unsettling and intriguing film. Striking, affecting and mordantly funny at times, its confidence evokes the ecstasy of films like Carrie, The Exorcist, and Jonathan Glazer's Under the Skin." Katie Rife of The A.V. Club gave the film a grade of "B+", saying that the finale was shocking.

Film reviewer Josh Larsen of Think Christian criticized the film:

Film critic Mark Kermode listed it as his favourite film of 2020, calling it an "electrifying debut".

Awards

References

External links
 
 
 
 

2019 films
2019 horror films
British horror films
British LGBT-related films
British psychological horror films
Films about nurses
A24 (company) films
StudioCanal films
Stage 6 Films films
Film4 Productions films
Religious horror films
Scarborough, North Yorkshire
Films set in Yorkshire
Films shot in North Yorkshire
2010s English-language films
2010s American films
2010s British films